People Before Profit (PBP) is a left-wing to far-left Trotskyist political party formed in October 2005. It is active in both the Republic of Ireland and Northern Ireland.

History

People Before Profit was established in 2005 as the People Before Profit Alliance by members of the Socialist Workers Party (SWP), a Trotskyist organisation affiliated to the International Socialist Tendency (IST). The Community & Workers Action Group (CWAG) in south Dublin joined the alliance in 2007 and brought along the party's first elected representative, Joan Collins, an anti–bin tax campaigner and former member of the Socialist Party. In February 2018, the SWP renamed itself the Socialist Workers Network (SWN) to reflect "a decision to focus on building People Before Profit, and within that to win and educate as many members as possible in revolutionary socialist politics."

The Socialist Environmental Alliance (SEA) was a political party which operated in Northern Ireland, based largely in the city of Derry.

The SEA contested the Northern Ireland Assembly 2003 election in the East Londonderry and Foyle seats (reflecting the party's Derry base). It polled poorly in East Londonderry, with candidate Marion 
Baur gaining 137 first preference votes (0.4% of the total), although in Foyle Eamonn McCann gained 2,257 first preference votes (5.5% of the total).

It contested the 2004 elections to the European Parliament, with Eamonn McCann their candidate. He won 9,172 first preference votes, or 1.6% of the total cast. McCann then stood in the 2005 general election in the Foyle constituency, winning 3.6% of the vote.

McCann again stood for the organisation in Foyle in the 2007 Assembly election. The group was dissolved in 2008 with most of it folding into the People Before Profit Alliance.

Republic of Ireland

People Before Profit contested several constituencies in the 2007 general election, polling around 9,000 first preferences, with Richard Boyd Barrett—the candidate in the Dún Laoghaire constituency—missing a seat on the 10th and final count by 7,890 votes to 9,910.

In May 2008, People Before Profit launched a campaign calling for a No vote on the Lisbon Treaty when it was put to the people.

In the Republic's 2009 local elections People Before Profit ran twelve candidates, including ten in County Dublin. It secured five seats in three of Dublin's four councils. As well as ten members of the SWP, Joan Collins and Pat Dunne of the CWAG ran in Dublin, and Donnie Fell (a former Waterford Crystal worker and trade union representative) in Waterford.

In the Republic's 2011 general election, both Richard Boyd Barrett and Joan Collins were elected to Dáil Éireann as TDs (deputies), running under a joint People Before Profit and United Left Alliance banner.

In April 2013, Joan Collins TD and Cllr Pat Dunne left the group to form United Left, a political party with former Socialist Party TD Clare Daly.

In the May 2014 local elections, People Before Profit won 14 seats including two seats outside Dublin on Sligo and Wexford County Councils.

People Before Profit supported the successful Right2Water Ireland campaign against the introduction of water charges in Ireland, which was launched in 2014. By 2017 the scale of the campaign resulted in the suspension and ultimately the scrapping of the funding model.

Discussions were held in August 2015 with the Anti-Austerity Alliance about forming a new political grouping. On 17 September 2015, the two parties announced they had formally registered as a single political party for electoral purposes. The new organisation was called the Anti-Austerity Alliance–People Before Profit.

At the 2016 general election, Boyd Barrett was re-elected. He was joined by fellow People Before Profit candidates Gino Kenny and Bríd Smith.

In 2016, Councillor Sonya Stapleton, representing Pembroke–South Dock on Dublin City Council, left the party, as did Councillor Ruth Nolan, a member of South Dublin County Council for Lucan, who joined Independents 4 Change.

In January 2019, Dublin City Councillor John Lyons resigned from the party due to disputes with the leadership. Cllr Lyons subsequently was a leading figure in the foundation of Independent Left. He criticised his former party saying: "Solidarity and People Before Profit are the closest fit to us but have a hierarchical, carefully controlled internal life that is not fit for the purpose of socialist change."

The party retained its three TDs in the 2020 Irish general election.

People Before Profit supported Debenhams Ireland workers in their 2020 industrial dispute.

On 28 February 2021, RISE, a democratic socialist party that had previously split from Solidarity in 2019, merged with People Before Profit. Paul Murphy became the party's 4th TD in the process. It maintains its media and functions as an internal organisation.

On 10 May 2021, Dún Laoghaire–Rathdown County Councillor Hugh Lewis departed from the party following an internal disciplinary procedure.

Northern Ireland

People Before Profit unsuccessfully ran one candidate, Sean Mitchell, in the 2007 Northern Ireland Assembly election, polling 774 first preferences in the Belfast West constituency. He successfully gained the right to stand in an election by threatening to take the then Secretary of State for Northern Ireland, Peter Hain, to court if the legal loophole preventing him from doing so was enforced. (England, Scotland and Wales had secured the right to contest candidates under the age of 20, providing they were over 18, for constituencies for devolved government, whereas Northern Ireland had been simply excluded).

People Before Profit ran four candidates in the Northern Ireland Assembly election of May 2011, winning 5,438 first-preference votes between them but no seats in the new Assembly. Its most successful candidate in this election was Eamonn McCann, who won 3,120 first-preference votes, or 8% of the total, in Foyle.

In the June 2011 Belfast West by-election, Gerry Carroll won 1,751 votes (7.6%), coming in third place and ahead of both unionist candidates.

In the 2014 Belfast City Council election, Carroll became the first People Before Profit councillor elected in Northern Ireland, winning 3rd place in the Black Mountain DEA, with 1,691 1st Preference votes.

In May 2016, Carroll topped the poll in the Belfast West constituency at the 2016 Assembly Election with 8,299 votes (22.9%), almost 4,000 first-preference votes clear of his nearest challenger, Sinn Féin MLA Fra McCann (Sinn Féin was running five candidates). This victory secured People Before Profit with their first elected MLA. Eamonn McCann also took a seat in the constituency of Foyle. In 2017, Carroll retained his seat but with a much reduced vote (12.2%), while McCann lost his.

The party gained 4 seats in the 2019 Local Elections. People Before Profit won 5 council seats, 3 in Belfast City Council and 2 in Derry.

The party stood two candidates in the 2019 general election, with their best performance being by Gerry Carroll in the Belfast West seat: he came second with 16%.

People Before Profit retained their singular seat in the 2022 Northern Ireland Assembly election.

Ideology and policies

	
People Before Profit are a Trotskyist party committed to political agitation through working-class mass action in capitalist societies. However, People Before Profit do not accept this label, with their website stating that "Trotskyist is the Labour Party's bizarre code word for anyone with strong left-wing principles". The party self-claims to be an eco-socialist party. It described its 2022 AGM as a "positive step forward in building a major, pluralist eco-socialist party in Ireland" and described its party programme as eco-socialist.

In the Northern Ireland Assembly, the party's assembly members sign the register as "socialist" when asked if they are "unionist" or "nationalist", resulting in an official designation of "other" in the assembly. However the party is not neutral on constitutional matters, and are in favour of "a 32 county socialist Ireland." People Before Profit support a referendum on Irish reunification. This is in contrast to their alliance partners Solidarity who oppose one.

People Before Profit have supported leaving the EU and campaigned for a 'Lexit' (a left-wing Brexit) in the 2016 EU referendum in Northern Ireland. Commenting on their pro-Brexit position, Gerry Carroll stated "We made a decision to say that the EU does not operate in the interests of working people anywhere, and the strongest example of that is Greece. What we need is a Brexit that is not shaped by Theresa May, we need one that is shaped by working-class people in Northern Ireland, England, Scotland and Wales. And one that is shaped by the trade union movement." Members of Sinn Féin criticised this stance, saying that supporting Brexit, tactically or otherwise, aligned People Before Profit with British parties such as the Conservatives, UKIP, the Democratic Unionist Party and Traditional Unionist Voice and regardless of People Before Profit's intentions, this would serve the pro-Brexit agenda. In response, Richard Boyd-Barrett tried to distance PBP's position from those parties, and noted that People Before Profit opposed a hard border, and would encourage "a movement of civil disobedience to remove border posts if they are imposed by either the UK government or the EU".

The party supports free public transport.

People Before Profit supports nationalising the "major Agri-corporations" and using them to finance a “just transition” for farmers and rural Ireland. People Before Profit also seeks to cut the national cow herd by 50% and pay farmers a green payment to offset this, provided a farmer doesn't earn more than €100,000 a year. People Before Profit seek to create a state-owned building corporation that would be used to retrofit existing homes.

People Before Profit supports the legalisation of cannabis for medical and general use. It states that it wants to "legislate for the use of medicinal cannabis for pain management of chronic conditions" and medical cannabis be "researched and made available as an evidence-based option for health care providers and patients". It also states that it wants the "non-commercialised legalisation of cannabis to be regulated by a new state body and dispensed via designated stores". In November 2022, Gino Kenny introduced a bill to legalise personal usage of cannabis, and possession of up to seven grams of cannabis.

In 2023, People Before Profit published a document which said that the Irish military and police force (Garda Siochana) would commit a coup on behalf of "wealthy elites" against any prospective left-wing government that formed in Ireland

Foreign policy 
People Before Profit is opposed to NATO and support Irish neutrality. They have said that NATO has a "bloody history" and accuse it of escalating the Ukrainian war "to the terrifying possibility that we could have a nuclear situation".

People Before Profit call for international sanctions against Israel and support the Palestinian-led movement Boycott, Divestment and Sanctions. They have called for "a comprehensive package of economic, political and cultural sanctions against Israel for warcrimes, ethnic cleansing and the crime of apartheid". 

People Before Profit oppose sanctions against Russia as a response to the 2022 Russian invasion of Ukraine. Murphy stated "We stood for the people of Ukraine and stand with them in their struggle against the Russian imperialist invasion", but said that sanctions "are hurting ordinary Russians and are only bolstering the Putin regime at home". Simon Coveney and Neale Richmond of Fine Gael suggested it is contradictory for People Before Profit to support sanctions against Israel but not against Russia. Paul Murphy responded "The situation in Israel/Palestine is that they've struggled for decades against the oppression of the Palestinian people. You have a call for BDS coming from ordinary Palestinians, including Palestinians who live within the state of Israel and suffer apartheid at the hands of Israel".

Election results and governments

Northern Ireland

Northern Ireland Assembly elections

Westminster elections

Northern Ireland local elections

Republic of Ireland

General elections

Irish local elections

European elections
People Before Profit have only contested European elections in the Republic of Ireland.

Notes

References

External links

2005 establishments in Ireland
All-Ireland political parties
Anti-austerity political parties in the United Kingdom
Anti-capitalist political parties
Ecosocialist parties
Left-wing politics in Ireland
Opposition to NATO
Political parties established in 2005
Socialist parties in Ireland
Trotskyist organisations in Ireland